Cliff Larsen is a Democratic member of the Montana Legislature. He was elected for Senate District 50, representing the Missoula, Montana, area, in 2008.

References

External links
 Archived campaign website

Living people
Year of birth missing (living people)
Democratic Party Montana state senators
21st-century American politicians